Robert Cotton (by 1504–1559) was an English politician.

He was a Member (MP) of the Parliament of England for Leicester in March 1553.

References

1559 deaths
English MPs 1553 (Edward VI)
Year of birth uncertain
Mayors of places in Leicestershire